The Gotthard railway is the Swiss trans-alpine railway line from northern Switzerland to the canton of Ticino. The line forms a major part of an important international railway link between northern and southern Europe, especially on the Rotterdam-Basel-Genoa corridor. The Gotthard Railway Company was the former private railway company which financed the construction of, and originally operated, that line.

The railway comprises an international main line through Switzerland from Basel (French Bâle) or Zürich to Immensee to Chiasso, together with branches, from Immensee to Lucerne and Rotkreuz, from Arth-Goldau to Zug, and from Bellinzona to Chiasso, via Locarno and Luino. The extreme differences in altitude necessitate the use of long ramped approaches on each side, together with seven spirals.

Construction of the line started in 1872, with some lowland sections opening by 1875. The full line opened in 1882, following completion of the Gotthard Tunnel. The line was incorporated into the Swiss Federal Railways in 1909, and electrified in 1922. The line has 36 tunnels totalling 31,216 metres. (See https://www.youtube.com/watch?v=FKKTsIh7_DQ)

The approaches to the existing tunnel continue to restrict speed and capacity on this important international route, and in 1992 it was decided to build a new lower level route on the Gotthard axis as part of the NRLA project. This route involves the construction of the new Gotthard Base Tunnel and Ceneri Base Tunnel. The Gotthard Base Tunnel has been completed and was integrated with the existing route in 2016, while the Ceneri Base Tunnel was opened in 2020.

History

Conception 
By the early years of the 1870s, northern Switzerland had a significant network of railways, with links to the adjoining railways of Germany and France. To the west, a line had reached , in the upper Rhone valley, from Lausanne. In the centre north, lines linked Olten, Lucerne, Zug and Zürich. However no line had yet reached through the Alps to southern Switzerland or the border with Italy, and all north to south rail traffic had to pass either to the west or east of Switzerland, through the Mont-Cenis, Semmering or Brenner railways.

A north-south route through Switzerland had been discussed as far back as 1848, and an international conference in Bern in 1869 had decided that the best route would be via the valleys of the rivers Reuss and Ticino, linked by a tunnel under the Gotthard Pass. The selected route was an ancient one, that had been used by pilgrims and traders since at least the 13th century.

Treaties for the construction of the line were made with the Kingdom of Italy, in 1869, and the German Empire, in 1871. The Gotthard Railway Company was incorporated in Lucerne (Canton) in 1871. The Italian government eventually contributed £2.25 million, with Switzerland and Germany each contributing £1.25 million.

Construction and opening 
Construction of the Gotthard railway started in 1872, and the first lowland sections from Biasca to Locarno and Lugano to Chiasso were opened by 1874.

The whole line was inaugurated with festivities in Lucerne and Chiasso from 21 May to 25 May 1882. Scheduled operation started on 1 June. At the time, the  Gotthard Rail Tunnel was the world's longest rail tunnel (seconded by the Simplon Tunnel in 1906). Soon after construction, the line was secured by the army with fortresses (for instance above Airolo and at Biasca) and ways to block the tunnel in case of an invasion (among others an artificial landslide to block the southern tunnel entrance).

At the same time the Aargauische Südbahn completed the section from Rotkreuz to Immensee, which provided a rail link from Aarau. The additional feeder lines from Lucerne to Immensee, and from Zug to Arth-Goldau were completed in 1887.

Early railway operations

The Gotthard railway time table from 1899 

The Gotthard Railway graphic timetable contains a great variety of information with regards to material and especially operational aspects in the year 1899, 17 years after the inauguration of the Gotthard tunnel and completion of the railway. The map key and captions to each column are to be found at the top of the page. Leading from left to right information is given on the location of each station's elevation in relation to sea level, the longitudinal profile, signal lights, tunnels and their length, for each route section on southbound journeys the greatest gradient, distances, employed telegraphs and their networking, signal bells and their connection, telephones, block stations, track layout of the respective station and their equipment, total usable length of the remaining tracks, the longest side track, station names and distances between them, distance to point of origin and between main stations. Departure and arrival times are displayed within the graphic timetable.

Information can be drawn as to the tunnel's vertex which lies at 1154.5 meters above sea level and the fact that the tunnel does not run in a straight line but rather in a slope down from either side of its vertex. The tunnel was designed in such a way that inflowing water would be able to drain. From the railway station of Göschenen to the tunnel's vertex the train lines ascend at an angle of 6 ‰ and descend at 2 ‰ from vertex to the village of Airolo. The tunnel's length is indicated to be 14,998 meters, its vertex being at kilometre 80. The old Gotthard railways' distances were measured from the town of Immensee, as clearly indicated on the graphic timetable.

Electrical Telegraphs and signal bells are listed on the distance column's right and a detailed description thereof is to be found in the chapters The Gotthard railway Telegraph Network and The Gotthard railway Signal Bells.

The track layout of each station shows that in 1899 the Gotthard railway ran on double-tracks from the villages of Flüelen to Giubiasco. Facing north the picture on the right shows the watchman's house at the Mondascia bridge depicts the double-tracks and advance signal to the entry signal before Biasca (at 132.5 km), mentioned in the timetable. The next picture on the right shows the Pianotondo viaduct and the Pianotono-spiral tunnel's upper gate with its watchman's house, which came into use during the days of the double-track steam service, roughly at the time of the graphic timetable's validity.

The graphic timetable sees two tracks running southwards from Giubiasco station. One is signposted "Chiasso", the other "Luino/Locarno". From this point onwards the railway runs on single tracks. Giubiasco's neighbouring stations to the south, Rivera-Bironico and Cadenazzo, are all on single tracks. At each underpass on the Ceneri section it is clearly visible to this day that these were built at greatly different points in time. The Giubiasco-Al Sasso and Al Sasso-Rivera sections were equipped with double-tracks in 1922 and 1934 respectively.

The graphic timetable is a two-dimensional image of the train journeys. Time is displayed horizontally from midnight XII o'clock to midnight XII o'clock. The stations along the journey, from Zug and Lucerne to Chiasso, Locarno and Luino are displayed vertically. The first scheduled train, an express train with 1st, 2nd and 3rd class carriages, leaves Bellinzona at 03:17. The train with the number 55 is powered by a steam locomotive and, according to the timetable, does not make a scheduled stop at Giubiasco, Rivera-Bironico and Taverne. Arrival at Lugano is scheduled at 04:09, from where it leaves again at 04:14. In 1899 the entire train journey from Bellinzona to Lugano was scheduled to be 52 minutes. Today (2017), the same journey on one of the EC trains takes 27 minutes. The illustrations shows that between Giubiasco and Rivera Bironico trains do not pass each other as in 1899 this was, as mentioned in the paragraph above, a single track line. This information can thus be drawn form both, the stations' track layout and the graphic timetable. Also visible on the graphic timetable is the fact that between Osogna and Biasca, trains however do pass each other along their journeys, it being a double-track line. Further, the Arth-Rigi-Bahn's trains (nowadays Rigi Railways), are also listed in the Gotthard railways' timetable. The timetable's scale is 15mm/hour horizontally and 1.75mm/km vertically.

The Gotthard railway telegraph network 

To coordinate trains, the Gotthard railway used a telegraph-network, which linked up all railway stations on the entire line from Luzern to Chiasso, Locarno and Luino. This network is pointed out on the left hand side of the graphic timetable dated 1899. The telegraphs for every railway station shown on the timetable are marked with a black dot. As a detailed section from the timetable shows, the Biasca station used four telegraphs at that time. One of those telegraphs linked all stations from Biasca to Bellinzona. Whatever message was tapped out on this telegraph (sent by morse code), was transmitted to all stations up to Bellinzona. A second telegraph linked all stations from Biasca to Göschenen.  What was tapped out on the third telegraph, reached only the railway stations Bellinzona, Faido, Airolo, Göschenen, Wassen and Erstfeld. The fourth telegraph was for long distances. Messages transmitted from there reached Bellinzona, Airolo, Erstfeld, Goldau and Luzern. The telegraphs with their Morse keys and the telegraph-relays were produced by </ref> (Bern).

The Gotthard railway signal bells 
The Gotthardbahn employed signal bells within its stations and along the line to signal any approaching train. An alarm was triggered once a train had left a neighbouring station or block station. These signal bells were partly installed along the line and signalled any construction worker of an approaching train. In addition, any railway watchman's house and railroad crossing would be equipped with a signal bell. Southbound trains were signalled by 3 triple chimes, northbound trains by two double chimes. The signalling mechanism at each signal bell had to be manually wound up every day by station employees and railway watchmen. Part of the mechanism was a weight having to be raised by help of a pulley. The electric signal triggering the alarm operated a relay, activating the bell's hammer through force of the aforementioned weight. Each signal bell within the Gotthard railway's network is marked on the graphic timetable. The railway watchman's house number 159 (Casello 159) signal bell on the Monte Ceneri line between Giubiasco and Rivera-Bironico is shown as an example in the timetable's excerpt. A southbound train departing Giubiasco for Rivera-Bironico would trigger alarms of eleven different signal bells on its 11 kilometres long journey. Around 1980 these signal bells were decommissioned.

Track maintenance and safety 

In the Gotthard Railway's early days ultrasound was not available to examine the tracks. Fractures within these were far more common than today, when special ultrasound equipped trains are employed in the maintenance process. The railway watchman was especially important in ensuring the Gotthard railway's safe operation. A railway watchman was assigned to a special segment of tracks which he had to inspect every day. Fractures, deformations and the tracks' general condition were to be reported to the track master. Tending to loose screws and cutting down shrubs were also part of the watchman's job description. Also putting out small shrub fires, caused by the heavily employed brakes of downhill running cargo trains, were part of his duty. The railway watchman was equipped with a red flag to be able to stop trains in an emergency. The Gotthard railway's  watchmen lived in specially provided watchman houses along the line. In Italian Language these watchman's houses are called Casello. Every day they had to inspect the tracks up to the next watchman's segment. The watchman houses were built along the entire Gotthard line with distances of up to 4 kilometres between them and were all numbered. From 1950 onward the track inspections didn't require as many inspections as before. Between Giubiasco and Rivera the railway watchmen then only had to perform such an inspection every other day. Their former watchman houses now remained unmanned and were subsequently used as holiday homes or private dwellings. From 1995 onward the Swiss Federal Railways (SBB) turned to selling these watchman houses.

Swiss Federal Railways 

The Gotthard Railway Company worked the Gotthard railway until 1909, when it became part of the Swiss Federal Railways. This was seven years after the creation of that state owned railway, and the Gotthard railway was the last major railway to be absorbed. In 1922, the whole line was electrified by Brown, Boveri & Cie with  supplied by overhead line.

The approaches to the Gotthard Tunnel are susceptible to rockfalls, regularly leading to closures of the railway line. In the worst such incident in recent times, the Gotthard line was closed to all traffic for almost one month following a rockfall near Gurtnellen on 5 June 2012, which killed one rail worker and injured two others. The closure caused massive disruption of both passenger and international freight traffic.

Route

North of Arth-Goldau
The Lucerne branch of the Gotthard railway commences in Lucerne station, facing the south shore of Lake Lucerne. From here it undertakes a 270 degree turn, heading first south, then west, north and east, as well as crossing the river Reuss, to reach the north shore of the lake. From here it continues along the west shore of the Küssnacht arm of the lake to reach Immensee station. Here it meets the Rotkreuz branch, which runs from Rotkreuz to the north.

Immensee station is considered the starting point of the main line of the Gotthard railway, and official distances to all points south are measured from here. Here it joined by the Zug branch of the Gotthard railways, and there is a junction with the Südostbahn route to Rapperswil and Romanshorn. Connection is also made with the Arth-Rigi-Bahn, a rack railway climbing the mountain Rigi.

The Zug branch of the Gotthard railway commences in the city of Zug. It makes a junction, in Zug station, with the line to Zürich via Thalwil. The line then follows the east shore of the Lake of Zug to reach Arth-Goldau.

Arth-Goldau - Erstfeld
From Brunnen to Flüelen, the line follows the Lake Lucerne (that part of it is also referred to as Urnersee). In that section, the Axen, the two tracks follow two different routes mainly in tunnel because the second track was built later (up to 1943) and on a straighter route through longer tunnels.

At Flüelen station, the railway makes a connection with the steamer services on Lake Lucerne. Steamers operate a shorter, in distance, but longer, in time, service to the city of Lucerne, serving many other towns and villages along the lake shore. The Gotthard Panorama Express uses this interchange to provide its tourist oriented boat and rail service between Lucerne and Lugano.

The depot at Erstfeld station houses rolling stock needed for the Gotthard route, i.e. for banking service. A Ce 6/8 "crocodile" serves as a memorial for the legendary Gotthard locomotives.

Northern ramp, Erstfeld - Göschenen
For the whole of the northern ramp from Erstfeld to Göschenen, the line follows the valley of the Reuss. The track now gets steeper with a gradient of up to 27 ‰. After Amsteg the line passes the Chärstelenbach Bridge and changes the side of the valley over the Intschireuss Bridge, which is, with its , the highest bridge in the SBB network.

The line passes over the Reuss twice, and the Meienreuss three times in this section.

Here the Gotthard line meets the Schöllenenbahn, a metre gauge rack operated branch of the Matterhorn Gotthard Bahn that ascends to Andermatt, where connections can be made over the Oberalppass to Chur or through the Furka Base Tunnel to Brig.

Gotthard Tunnel

Here the tunnel crosses the border between the canton of Uri and the canton of Ticino, and line passes from the German-speaking part of Switzerland to the Italian-speaking part.

Both north and south portals are within a few hundreds metres from those of the Gotthard Road Tunnel.

Southern ramp, Airolo - Bellinzona
After passing through Airolo station, the line crosses the Ticino and descends through its valley in the Leventina.

At Piotta, the Funicolare del Ritom ascends to the Ritom dam. The valley narrows to the Piotta canyon, and the line passes two spirals ("Piottino-Loops") to lose  in height before reaching Faido.

Bellinzona - Luino / Locarno

Just beyond Bellinzona station, a major junction is reached at Giubiasco. Here the original main line branches off what is now considered the main Gotthard line to Lugano and Chiasso.

What was originally considered the main line continues down the valley of the Ticino, crossing the Italian border and continuing to meet the Italian railway system at Pino on the eastern shore of Lake Maggiore. The line beyond Pino to the Italian town of Luino, although Italian-owned, has always been operated as part of the Swiss system.

At Cadenazzo on the line to Pino, a further branch crosses the Ticino and runs a short distance down the western shore of Lago Maggiore to a terminus at the Swiss resort town of Locarno. Transfer can be made at Locarno station to the international metre gauge Domodossola–Locarno railway.

Bellinzona - Chiasso
From here the line rises again to Monte Ceneri, the pass between the Sopraceneri and the Sottoceneri, and then passes through the two parallel, single-track Monte Ceneri Tunnels.

At Lugano station interchange is made with the Lugano–Ponte Tresa railway, a metre gauge railway to the town of Ponte Tresa. Following the western waterside of Lake Lugano, the line crosses Lake Lugano at the Melide causeway, a  causeway and bridge.

The track follows the eastern waterside from the Melide causeway to Capolago-Riva San Vitale station. Here interchange is made with the Monte Generoso railway, a rack railway to the summit of Monte Generoso. The Gotthard line then continues to Mendrisio and Chiasso. Chiasso station houses the border controls and has a large international marshalling yard. Conventional trains change locomotives here due to different traction voltages and train protection systems in Italy.

Operation

Services 
The Gotthard line carries a mixture of freight and long distance passenger trains over the full length of the line. The long distance passenger trains include EuroCity (EC) trains between Zürich and Milan, and ICN and IR trains between a number of cities in northern Switzerland and various points in Ticino. Passenger trains using the Gotthard line in the past included the Trans Europ Express trains Gottardo, Roland, and Ticino.

Regional commuter rail services also operate on the northern and southern sections of the Gotthard line. To the north, line S2 of the Zug Stadtbahn operates hourly between Zug, Arth-Goldau and Erstfeld, whilst line S3 of the S-Bahn Luzern operates hourly between Luzern, Arth-Goldau and Brunnen.

To the south, the Gotthard line is served by trains on line S10 of the Treni Regionali Ticino Lombardia (TILO), which operate every half-hour between Bellinzona, Lugano and Chiasso, with some trains extending northwards to Airolo and southwards to Milan. The same operator's lines S20 and S30 also operate over the Gotthard railway in the Bellinzona area, before proceeding down the branches to Locarno and Luino respectively, with some S30 trains extended to Milan Malpensa Airport.

Besides trains operated by the Swiss Federal Railways, other railway companies have also been able to run trains on the Gotthard route since the introduction of open access in 2001. Companies that have taken advantage of this include Deutsche Bahn AG, who operate through freight trains from Germany to Italy.

Rolling stock 

Most of the Swiss locomotives were originally constructed for the Gotthard line, so many of them were called "Gotthardlokomotiven", for instance C 5/6 "Elephant", Ce 6/8 and Be 6/8 "Krokodil", Ae 8/14 "Landilok", Ae 6/6, Re 620. Famous trainsets on the Gotthard route are the Trans Europ Express and the Roter Pfeil, as well as the tilting train, Cisalpino Pendolino.

Nowadays passenger trains are mostly pulled by Re 4/4 II (up to two for long trains) and sometimes by Re 460, freight trains by Re 6/6 and Re 4/4 III. Up to 1300 tons may be pulled by an Re 6/6 with an Re 4/4 III. This combination is sometimes called a Re 10/10. If the trains are heavier, then any additional locomotives must be used as banking locomotives at the rear of the train, because the tractive effort of more power at the front of the train would exceed the capacity of the couplers within the train.

Civil engineering

Bridges 

The construction of each bridge represented its own individual challenge, depending on the surrounding geography and geology.With the exception of three arch bridges all steel bridges consisted of very simple, straight, single beam truss constructions. These had to be reinforced already before 1914 still during steam operation of the Gotthardbahn due to quickly increasing traffic and load. Fish-belly truss structures were attached to the bridges from below where possible and an arch truss structure was added from the top, where a short clear height made this necessary, besides other measures. Eventually all original iron bridges had to be replaced with modern bridges because they had been built and were repeatedly reinforced to specifications that again and again were surpassed by increasing traffic, velocity and load.

Notable originally single beam truss bridges on the Gotthardbahn are:
The bridge was reinforced with a fish-belly structure. The modern replacement still uses the centre column and the stone arch abutments of the original.
The bridge was reinforced with a "fish-belly" before the iron structure was replaced.
The original iron construction has been replaced.

Current developments 
The historical route, with its long climbs and spiral routings, restricts speed and capacity on this important international route. As a result, a largely new lower level route was constructed as the Gotthard axis of the NRLA project.

The Gotthard Base Tunnel, running from a point near Erstfeld to a point near Biasca, opened to traffic on 1 June 2016, with full service starting in December of that year.

The Ceneri Base Tunnel, from Camorino to the south of Bellinzona, and Vezia to the north of Lugano, opened in 2020.

The Gotthard Base Tunnel opened in 2016, and the Ceneri Base Tunnel in 2020. Now that they have opened, all rail traffic still needs to use the existing route north of Erstfeld, between Biasca and Bellinzona, and south of Lugano. The bypassed sections of the existing route are being retained for local passenger services, for general capacity and as a diversionary route.

Further bypasses have been planned as part of the Gotthard axis of the NRLA project, including a new largely tunnelled route from Arth-Goldau to Erstfeld, and an extension of the existing Zimmerberg Base Tunnel on the route between Zürich and Zug. No commitment to construct these sections of line has yet been made.

Operator Sudostbahn has announced, as of 13 December 2020, it will run a new service from Basel and Zurich via the original Gotthard line, using Stadler Flirt units which are also used on the Voralpen express.

See also 
NRLA and the Lötschberg railway, Switzerland's other major Alpine freight corridor.
Saint-Gotthard Massif
Gotthard Pass
Gotthard Base Tunnel
List of spiral tunnels and tunnels on a curved alignment

References

Further reading

External links 

 Detailed description by Bruno Lämmli (in German)
 Gotthardbahn-website by Waldis Carl (in German)
  illustrated description of the route

 
Defunct railway companies of Switzerland
International railway lines
Railway lines in Switzerland
Railway lines opened in 1882
Transport in the canton of Uri
Transport in the canton of Schwyz
Transport in Ticino
Alpine Railways connecting Italy
International Railways connecting Italy
Transport in the Alps

it had morse code on the trains